Kimberly Beck (born January 9, 1956) is a former American actress and model. She is best known for her role as Trish Jarvis in Joseph Zito's Friday the 13th: The Final Chapter (1984). Her other film roles include Alfred Hitchcock's Marnie (1964), Luc Besson's The Big Blue (1988), George T. Miller's Frozen Assets (1992), and Roland Emmerich's Independence Day (1996).

Life and career
Beck was born to the actress Cindy Robbins.  She starred in such movies as Massacre at Central High, Roller Boogie, and Friday the 13th: The Final Chapter. Among her notable television credits are  General Hospital, Capitol (billed as Kimberly Beck-Hilton), Fantasy Island, Buck Rogers in the 25th Century (as one side of a Jekyll-and-Hyde character, whose counterpart was played by Trisha Noble), Westwind, The Brady Bunch, Dynasty, Lucas Tanner and Peyton Place (as the character Kim Schuster). As a child, she appeared in Alfred Hitchcock's Marnie and television commercials for such products as Mattel Toymakers Barbie and Chatty dolls. She had a very brief appearance on The Munsters as a transformed Eddie Munster after Eddie drank the rest of Grandpa's Texas Playgirl Potion in season 1, episode 33 entitled "Lily Munster, Girl Model". She starred on the pilot episode of Eight Is Enough as Nancy Bradford, the role that, in the series, went to Dianne Kay. She also had the role of Diane Porter in Rich Man, Poor Man Book II with Peter Strauss and appeared in a host of other well-received television miniseries productions. In 1968, she and her stepfather Tommy Leonetti, then working in Australia, recorded the single "Let's Take a Walk", released under the name of "Tommy Leonetti and his daughter Kim". It charted at #4 on the Melbourne charts.

In 1988, Beck married producer Jason Clark and they had two sons.

Filmography

Film

Television

References

External links
 
 

1956 births
Living people
Actresses from Glendale, California
American child actresses
American film actresses
American soap opera actresses
American television actresses
Glendale High School (Glendale, California) alumni
21st-century American women